Jalaliyeh Jonubi (also Romanized as Jalālīyeh Jonūbī; also known as Şadr-e Jalālīyeh) is a village in Howmeh-ye Sharqi Rural District, in the Central District of Dasht-e Azadegan County, Khuzestan Province, Iran. At the 2006 census, its population was 1,140, in 217 families.

References 

Populated places in Dasht-e Azadegan County